Chop–Tysa is a land border crossing between Ukraine and Hungary on the Ukrainian side, near the village of Solomonovo, Uzhhorod Raion, Zakarpattia Oblast.

The crossing is situated on Highway M06. Across the border on the Hungarian side is the town of Zahony, Szabolcs-Szatmár-Bereg County, Northern Great Plain.

The type of crossing is automobile. The types of transportation for automobile crossings are passenger and freight. Pedestrian and bicycle movement is closed.

The port of entry is part of the Tysa customs post of Chop customs.

See also
 State Border of Ukraine

References

External links
 State Border Guard of Ukraine website
 General information from The State Border Service website

Zakarpattia Oblast
Hungary–Ukraine border crossings
Geography of Zakarpattia Oblast